Rubia laurae, the Cyprus madder, is a trailing perennial with a woody rootstock, stems 10–100 cm long. Leaves 4-whorled, simple, irregularly serrulate, glaucous, coriaceous, sessile, with a broad asymmetrical base, 8–30 x 2–8 mm. Flowers in terminal cymes, small, yellow-brownish, with a 5-merous corolla. Flowers May–August. Fruit a black, globose, fleshy, drupe.

Habitat 
Rocky and stony, dry hillsides, in garigue, vineyard edges or pine forests at 0–1200 m altitude.

Distribution
Endemic to Cyprus where it occur in Lysos, Panayia, Arminou, Mesa Potamos, Kato Amiandos, Platres area, the Limassol Forest, Erimi, the Pentadaktylos Range.

References

External links
 http://herbaryum.neu.edu.tr/index.php?id=66&menu=3
 http://www.theplantlist.org/tpl/record/kew-180319
 https://www.flickr.com/photos/cladoniophile/12127152154/

laurae
Endemic flora of Cyprus